The 1997 NCAA Division I Men's Basketball Championship Game was the finals of the 1997 NCAA Division I men's basketball tournament and it determined the national champion for the 1996–97 season. The 1997 National Title Game was played on March 31, 1997, at the RCA Dome in Indianapolis, Indiana. The 1997 National Title Game was played between the 1997 West Regional Champions, #1-seeded Kentucky and the 1997 Southeast Regional Champions, #4-seeded Arizona.

Participating teams

Arizona

Southeast
Arizona (#4 seed) 65, South Alabama (#13 Seed) 57
Arizona 73, College of Charleston (#12 Seed) 69
Arizona 85, Kansas (#1 seed) 82
Arizona 96, Providence (#10 seed) 92
Final Four
Arizona 66, North Carolina (#1 seed) 58

Kentucky

West
Kentucky (#1 seed) 92, Montana (#16 seed) 58
Kentucky 75, Iowa (#8 seed) 69
Kentucky 83, Saint Joseph's (#12 seed) 68
Kentucky 72, Utah (#2 seed) 59
Final Four
 Kentucky 78, Minnesota (#1 seed) 69

Starting lineups

Game summary

References

NCAA Division I Men's Basketball Championship Game
NCAA Division I Men's Basketball Championship Games
Arizona Wildcats men's basketball
Kentucky Wildcats men's basketball
College sports tournaments in Indiana
Basketball competitions in Indianapolis
NCAA Division I Men's Basketball Championship Game
NCAA Division I Men's Basketball Championship Game
1990s in Indianapolis